Matthew Howard Taylor (born 4 March 1973) is an Australian politician. He was the Liberal member for the Western Australian Legislative Assembly seat of Bateman from 2013 to 2017.

After a redistribution shifted much of the Liberal base in Alfred Cove to Bateman, Taylor was forced into a preselection contest with former minister Dean Nalder, Alfred Cove's last member. Nalder won the contest, leading Taylor to contest the new seat of Bicton. He lost to Labor challenger Lisa O'Malley.

References

1973 births
Living people
Members of the Western Australian Legislative Assembly
Politicians from Perth, Western Australia
Liberal Party of Australia members of the Parliament of Western Australia
21st-century Australian politicians